Calgary Queens Park was a provincial electoral district in Calgary, Alberta, Canada, mandated to return a single member to the Legislative Assembly of Alberta using the first past the post method of voting from 1963 to 1971.

History
The riding was created from a slice of Calgary Bowness during the 1963 election. The riding disappeared when it was merged with Calgary North to create Calgary-McKnight during the 1971 election.

The riding was a thin strip that ran north from Downtown to the north end city limits, and on the west side of Centre Street.

Members of the Legislative Assembly (MLAs)

Election results

1963 general election

1967 general election

See also
List of Alberta provincial electoral districts

References

Further reading

External links
Elections Alberta
The Legislative Assembly of Alberta

Former provincial electoral districts of Alberta
Politics of Calgary
1963 establishments in Alberta
1967 disestablishments in Alberta
Constituencies established in 1963
Constituencies disestablished in 1967